Kharmizan (also Romanized as Kharmīzān) is a village in Emamzadeh Seyyed Mahmud Rural District, Sardasht District, Dezful County, Khuzestan Province, Iran. At the 2006 census, its population was 115, in 18 families.

References 

Populated places in Dezful County